Mattel Television is the television production division of American toy and entertainment company Mattel, originally founded under the name Mattel Creations on March 31, 2016. It is headed by general manager and senior vice president, Frederic Soulie.

History

Mattel Creations was formed on March 31, 2016, bringing all three of Mattel's internal content production units: Mattel Playground Productions, HIT Entertainment, and the American Girl creative team in Middleton, Wisconsin, under their auspices and absorb them. Mattel's then-chief content officer Catherine Balsam-Schwaber was named to head the unit, while Christopher Keenan was moved up out of HIT to be the division's senior vice president of content development and production. Two pacts with DHX Media and 9 Story Media Group were placed into Mattel Creations. The DHX partnership with Mattel included HIT properties (Bob the Builder and Fireman Sam) and direct Mattel properties (Little People and Polly Pocket); the partnership included new multi-platform content development and production and distribution of new and existing content. The 9 Story deal was directly with HIT for 2017 revivals of Barney & Friends and Angelina Ballerina; there were originally reboots of both which were announced, but as at now, those plans are/were either scrapped or nothing was heard of in terms of green-lighting them.

Mattel Creations and Universal Pictures Home Entertainment Content Group had agreed to an exclusive worldwide SVOD rights agreement for the Barbie film library on October 16, 2016, for the next seven years and included the two film releases at the time; Barbie: Star Light Adventure and Barbie: Video Game Hero.

With Balsam-Schwaber taking the general manager position at Craftsy, Mattel's president and chief operating officer Richard L. Dickson took over responsibility for Mattel Creations and was not planning to fill the chief creative officer post.

Mattel hired former Disney Channels Worldwide programming executive Adam Bonnett as executive producer and head of a reorganized Mattel Television on February 5, 2019, which effectively replaced Mattel Creations. A week later, Mattel Television announced a slate of twenty-two animated and live-action television programs. This division works with the franchise management division's senior vice president of content distribution and business development, Frederic Soulie, who would also triple as the new division's general manager and senior vice president.

On February 23, 2021, Mattel Television announced the return of the Monster High brand three years after its last production with a CGI-animated series and a live-action musical film, which both aired on Nickelodeon and Paramount+ in the United States on October 6, 2022. On August 30, 2021, with the Universal deal expired, Mattel struck a deal with local home video releasing powerhouses, Mill Creek Entertainment and NCircle Entertainment, for the newer Netflix-based content for DVD, Blu-ray, and Digital HD distribution to U.S. and Canadian markets.

On September 7, 2021, following the debut of the streaming television film Barbie: Big City, Big Dreams on Netflix, Mattel hired former NBCUniversal vice president of current programming, Philip "Phil" Breman, to be the division's vice president for scripted and unscripted live-action series development. Following its global popularity success, Mattel Television unveiled a 26-episode CGI-animated streaming television musical serial adaptation and continuation of the film on February 1, 2022, known as Barbie: It Takes Two. The first half of episodes were broadcast on television in Australia, the UK and Ireland, Canada, and Portugal and debuted in the U.S. on Netflix on April 8, with the other half debuting on October 1.

Then on February 14, 2023, Mattel announced a new Barney and Friends franchise coming soon in 2024. There has been rumors that Bob West, The originating actor for Barney the Dinosaur would be coming back to voice him, along with Barney toys and movies being produced in 2025.

Filmography

Mattel Studios/Mattel Entertainment

HIT Entertainment
(excluding the rights to The Wiggles, Fraggle Rock, Animal Jam (TV series), ToddWorld, Wallace and Gromit, Shaun the Sheep, & Timmy Time. Shows From Chapman Entertainment (Mins Raa Raa the Noisy Lion) Nina's Little Fables, Monkey See, Monkey Do, Some Shows From Broadway Video Harvey Comics And Woodland Animations Plus Brum (TV series), The Adventures of Teddy Ruxpin, Bananaman, Fourways Farm, The HIT Wildlife library The Telebugs, & Alvin and the Chipmunks (1983 TV series).)

Lyrick Studios

Gullane Entertainment

Notes

References

Mattel
American companies established in 2016
Television production companies of the United States
Entertainment companies based in California
Companies based in Burbank, California
Entertainment companies established in 2016
Entertainment companies of the United States
2016 establishments in California
American animation studios